Good Morning Universe – The Very Best of Toyah is a double-CD compilation released by Toyah Willcox in 2007. It is the first ever career spanning retrospective collection covering all of Toyah's albums from Safari Records with her band, through to solo recordings up to 2003's Velvet Lined Shell. It includes Toyah's UK charting singles, classic album cuts, live tracks, collaborations, and previously unreleased remixes and demos.

Track listing

CD1
"Victims of the Riddle"
"Neon Womb"
"Danced"
"Race Through Space"
"Bird in Flight"
"Blue Meanings"
"It's a Mystery"
"I Want to be Free"
"Jungles of Jupiter"
"Obsolete"
"Pop Star"
"Thunder in the Mountains"
"Good Morning Universe"
"Run Wild, Run Free"
"Brave New World"
"Angel & Me"
"Ieya 1982"
"Be Proud, Be Loud, Be Heard"
"Rebel Run"
"The Vow"

CD2
"Don't Fall in Love (I Said)"
"Should Passing Through Soul"
"World in Action"
"Echo Beach"
"Moonlight Dancing"
"Sun Up"
"Revive the World"
"Prostitute"
"Wife"
"Homeward"
"Brilliant Day"
"Ophelia's Shadow"
"Angel (Demo) Previously Unreleased"
"Now I'm Running (Remix) Previously Unreleased"
"Invisible Love"
"God Ceases to Dream"
"Symbiotic (Trey Gunn & Toyah)"
"Little Tears of Love"
"Velvet Lined Shell"

References

2007 compilation albums
Toyah Willcox albums